Jimmy Hogarth (born 1974, Orkney Islands, Scotland) is a London-based producer and songwriter, whose production and writing credits include,  Amy Winehouse, Sia, Tom Grennan, Paolo Nutini, Duffy, Corinne Bailey Rae, Ren Harvieu, Estelle, Tina Turner, KT Tunstall, James Blunt, James Morrison, James Bay (singer), Maverick Sabre,  Dermot Kennedy,

In 2005, he was introduced to Welsh singer Duffy and went on to contribute four tracks, including the single "Warwick Avenue" to her five million selling debut album Rockferry.

In 2008, he received a Grammy award for his work on the Suzanne Vega album, Beauty & Crime.

Hogarth is a fan of soul music such as Sam Cooke and Aretha Franklin, but admits to listening to heavy rock during his youth.

He lives and works in London with his wife, former Black Box Recorder vocalist Sarah Nixey.

References

External links
Discogs.com - Jimmy Hogarth Discography
Grammy.com - Official Grammy website
Jimmy Hogarth homepage
 Discography 
Life.com: 50th Annual Grammy Awards - Pre-Telecast Press Room

1974 births
Living people
People from Orkney
British record producers
Grammy Award winners
British songwriters
The Mescaleros members